Boston Mwanza (born 26 December 1977) is a Zambian former professional footballer who played as a midfielder. He played in four matches for the Zambia national team in 2001 and 2002. He was also named in Zambia's squad for the 2002 African Cup of Nations tournament.

References

External links
 
 
 

1977 births
Living people
Zambian footballers
Association football midfielders
Zambia international footballers
2002 African Cup of Nations players
Place of birth missing (living people)